Broadcasting Complaints Commission may refer to:
A predecessor of the Broadcasting Authority of Ireland
Broadcasting Complaints Commission (UK)
Broadcasting Complaints Commission of South Africa